Michael Brady  (born 28 February 1948) is an English-born Australian musician, most commonly associated with the Australian rules football anthems "Up There Cazaly", referring to 1910s St Kilda and 1920s South Melbourne player Roy Cazaly, and "One Day in September", which were released by The Two-Man Band.   Both songs have become synonymous with Australian rules football and are traditionally sung on AFL Grand Final day in September.

Biography

1948-1977: Early life and early releases
Brady was born in England in 1948 and migrated to Australia in the 1950s with his family. His first job was at the Commonwealth Aircraft Corporation factory in Port Melbourne, Victoria, as a sheet metal worker. He started performing when he was 15 and he was one-third of the 1960s pop act MPD Ltd (which stood for Mike, Pete [Watson] and Danny [Finley]) which had hits in Australia including "Little Boy Sad" and "Lonely Boy".  The band toured Australia and the U.K. Brady also toured Vietnam entertaining troops, with a different band which included Wayne Duncan, Gary Howard and country brother and sister act Ricki and Tammy. After the breakup of MPD Ltd.,

In the early 1970s, Brady continued to release a number of singles, including two which reached the Australian top 50.

In the mid-1970s, Brady started his own record company called "Full Moon Records" and a publishing company called "Remix Publishing".

1978-1980: Two-Man Band & "Up There Cazaly"

In 1978, The Mojo Singers had reached the top of the Australian charts with the single "C'mon Aussie C'mon" which had been written to promote World Series Cricket, shown on Channel Nine. Seven Network reached out to Brady to write a jingle for the Victorian Football League (VFL), which Brady wrote "Up There Cazaly", referencing footballer Roy Cazaly. He worked with Pete Sullivan on recording the jingle.

The popularity of the jingle led to the release of the song in July 1979 credited to The Two-Man Band and it reached #1 on the Australian charts in September 1979 and was the most popular single recorded by an Australian artist that year. The song became the highest selling Australian single ever with sales of over 240,000 as of October 1979 and 260,000 as of the end of 1980.

The Two-Man Band released a further three top 100 singles in 1980 and 1981.

1981-present: Continued success
In July 1981, Brady released, Mike Brady Presents: The Songs of Football's Greatest, an album referencing numerous VFL players. the album peaked at number 44 on the ARIA Charts.

In 1982 Brady wrote "You're Here to Win" as the theme song for the 1982 Commonwealth Games.

Brady has continued to work in advertising, writing jingles such as "Dodo, Dodo, internet that flies" for Dodo Internet and "Lucky you're with AAMI".

In 1987, Brady recorded versions of all of the VFL team's theme songs for an album in 1987. Brady also co-wrote and produced another popular AFL (Australian Football League) jingle, "That's What I Like About Football", sung by Greg Champion.

In 2003, "Up There Cazaly" was reworked as "Up There Australia" to show support for Australian troops in the War of Iraq in 2003.

In addition to his jingle writing and performing, Brady also works at Melbourne radio station, 3AW He is the host of Mike to Midnight, Saturday nights from 6pm until Midnight, during the non-football months and occasionally fills in on other 3AW programs such as Nightline.

Brady is also the chairman of Cogmetrix, a predictive people analytics company that uses cognitive neuroscience software for talent management; recruitment, productivity and organisational development.

Brady has for a number of years sung the Australian national anthem before the start of the Puffing Billy Great Train Race in Belgrave.

Community and charity work
Brady is a board member on the Prostate Cancer Foundation Australia Victorian Board and has performed at many men's health events. He has been a board director of Variety Victoria and is a Life Member of the organisation.
 
Brady is a patron of the Bali Children Foundation and the Australian Huntington's Disease Association (Vic), and is involved with the Bluearth Foundation, Melbourne Legacy and the Yooralla Society. He is also an Australia Day ambassador.

Personal life
Brady lives in Melbourne, Australia. He has four children.

Discography

Studio albums

Extended plays

Singles

See also
 The Two-Man Band

Honours and awards
In the 2013 Queens Birthday Honours List, Mike Brady was made a member of the Order of Australia (AM) "For significant service to the community, and to music as a composer and performer".
In 2017 he was named Victorian of the Year by the Victoria Day Council.

TV Week / Countdown Awards
Countdown was an Australian pop music TV series on national broadcaster ABC-TV from 1974 to 1987, it presented music awards from 1979 to 1987, initially in conjunction with magazine TV Week. The TV Week / Countdown Awards were a combination of popular-voted and peer-voted awards.

|-
| 1979
| himself
| Most Outstanding Achievement
| 
|-

References

External links
"Footy anthem boost for troops" Melbourne Age 3 April 2003
Book review of Up There Mike Brady
"Whats a matter you, hey" Melbourne Age 24 July 2005
3AW personalities Mike Brady
Shock Records information on 1999 version of "Up There Cazaly"
Oz Net Music Charts Top Hits of 1979
Australia Day ambassador page on Mike Brady
"Mike Brady Bloodlines"
"AFL's music man Mike Brady has an Irish awakening" Sydney Morning Herald 18 October 2014

Further reading
Noel Delbridge Up There, Mike Brady, Coulomb Communications Port Melbourne Victoria 

1948 births
Living people
English emigrants to Australia
Australian male singers
Australian songwriters
Jingle composers
Members of the Order of Australia